Tekmen is a town in Bozyazı district of Mersin Province, Turkey.

Geography 
Tekmen is a Mediterranean coastal town. Toros mountains are just north of the town and the coastal plain of the town is a narrow strip between the sea and the mountains. Mountains are covered by maquis shrubland  and red pine forests.
Tekmen is a part of Bozyazı district which in turn is a part of Mersin Province. The population was 3,049 as of 2012. as of 2012.

People 
The residents of Tekmen are members of a Turkmen tribe named Teke, who is known to be the founder of Teke Beylik in southeastern Anatolia in the 13th and 14th centuries. They were originally nomads on the Toros mountains. In 1989, Tekmen was declared township.

Economy 
In Tekmen, greenhouse agriculture and animal husbandry are two important economic activities. However, animal husbandry is now on the decline. The most important crops are vegetables, citrus, strawberries, bananas and peanuts.

Although tourism has not yet arrived in Tekmen, many people from Anatolian region bought summer houses here and the touristic potential of the town is promising.

References 

Populated places in Mersin Province
Towns in Turkey
Populated places in Bozyazı District
Populated coastal places in Turkey